Nina Prinz (born 5 November 1982 in Kassel) is a German motorcycle racer. She currently competes in the Qatari Superbike Championship aboard a Kawasaki ZX-10R.

Grand Prix motorcycle racing

By season

Races by year

External links

http://www.ninaprinz.de/

1982 births
Living people
German motorcycle racers
Moto2 World Championship riders
Female motorcycle racers